Nina Kaczorowski (born June 6, 1975), a.k.a. Nina K, is an American actress, stunt woman, model and dancer.

Nina was born in New Jersey into a large family from Łódź, Poland. The family moved to Texas when she was six years old. Her upbringing was traditionally Polish.  As a teenager, Nina started modeling in Houston and Dallas, and by age 19, she began learning to be a stunt artist.

Nina achieved early success in modeling and she moved to New York City as one of Wilhelmina's most sought after models.  Soon after her success in New York, Nina began booking national television commercials, and her acting coach encouraged her to move to Hollywood. She moved out West.

Soon after he arrival in Hollywood, Nina landed a role in Once Upon a Time in China and America with Jet Li, followed by a part opposite Billy Bob Thornton in Sam Raimi's A Simple Plan.  She continued to act in films such as Tomcats, Pearl Harbor, Coyote Ugly, A.I., Minority Report (as the virtual reality girl), the SciFi flick, The Island and she also played a role in the television series Las Vegas (Season 3 "Like a Virgin"). She had minor, but critical, role in Two Tickets to Paradise (2006). Nina appeared in Austin Powers in Goldmember, where she played Goldmember's red-headed henchwoman.

References

External links

1975 births
American film actresses
Female models from New Jersey
American stunt performers
Living people
American people of Polish descent
Actresses from New Jersey
21st-century American women